The concept of size homotopy group is analogous in size theory of the classical concept of homotopy group. Consider the lexicographical order  on  defined by setting  if and only if . For every  set .

See also

 Size function
 Size functor
 Size pair
 Natural pseudodistance

References

Algebraic topology